P.D.Q. Bach & Peter Schickele: The Jekyll & Hyde Tour was released in 2007 by Telarc Records. The album contains works by  Peter Schickele, sometimes as his alter-ego P.D.Q. Bach, including a collection of vocal works and a string quartet. It is a live recording of the "Jekyll & Hyde" Tour.

Performers
 Professor Peter Schickele, piano, bass
 Michèle Eaton, off-coloratura soprano
 David Düsing, tenor profundo
 The Armadillo String Quartet
Barry Socher, violin
Connie Kupka, violin
Ray Tischer, viola
Armen Ksajikian, cello

Track listing
Long Live The King, S. 1789 (P.D.Q. Bach) (1:58) 
Introduction (6:30)
Four Next-To-Last Songs, S. Ώ – 1 (P.D.Q. Bach)
Das kleines Birdie (2:53)
Der Cowboykönig (3:09)
Gretchen am Spincycle (1:13)
Es was ein dark und shtormy Night (5:10)
Introduction (5:37)
String Quartet in F Major “The Moose”, S. Y2K (P.D.Q. Bach)
Allegro ma non troposphere (11:09)
Largo alla Fargo (6:10)
Menuetto no sweato (3:41)
Grave e molto deepo; Allegro con brie
Two Rounds (Peter Schickele)
Hedi McKinley (1:00)
Introduction (1:20)
D'Indy's Turkey (0:46)
Introduction (1:10)
Two P.D.Q. Bach Rounds 
The Mule (1:02)
Introduction (0:13)
O Serpent (1:28)
Two Songs (Peter Schickele)
If Love is Real (2:50)
Introduction (1:42)
Cyndi (2:40)
Introduction (1:15)
Songs from Shakespeare (Peter Schickele)
Macbeth's Soliloquy (1:15)
Hamlet's Soliloquy (1:02)
The Three Witches from "Macbeth" (0:42)
Juliet's Soliloquy (0:55)
Funeral Oration from "Julius Caesar" (1:32)
Introduction (0:13)
Listen Here, Tyrannosaurus Rex (Peter Schickele) (1:55)

Technical Information
P.D.Q. Bach — The Jekyll & Hyde Tour was recorded live at Gordon Center in Owings Mills, Maryland, June 16, 2007

Sources
 P.D.Q. Bach & Peter Schickele: Jekyll & Hyde Tour

P. D. Q. Bach live albums
2007 live albums
2007 classical albums
2000s comedy albums
Telarc Records albums